Clara Mónica Gutiérrez (born 8 March 1955), is an Argentine journalist.

Career
Mónica Gutiérrez made her debut on Rosario television while still an adolescent in the 1970s. She holds a degree in Social Communication Sciences. During Argentina's last military dictatorship, she was the presenter of the news shows 60 minutos and Informe Uno, both on ATC. With the advent of democracy she remained with ATC, hosting Veintiocho millones, Treinta millones, Noticiero nacional, and the talk show Veinte mujeres. On cable television she hosted Treinta y nueve semanas y media and Las manos en la masa.

Awards and nominations

 Distinción Alicia Moreau de Justo (1990)
 ATVC for Best Journalist (1993)
 Konex Award (1997)

Honors
 Honorary citizen of the Italian Republic, on the part of comune Gagliato, Catanzaro, Calabria
 Order of Cavaliere della Repubblica Italiana, presidency of Francesco Cossiga

References

External links
 Biography at the Konex Foundation 

1955 births
Argentine television journalists
Argentine women journalists
Living people
National University of Rosario alumni
People from Rosario, Santa Fe
Women television journalists